Andrajos is a typical dish of Jaén province, Albacete, Granada province and Murcia, Spain.

It consists of a stew of tomato, onion, garlic, red pepper and rabbit, thickened with cake flour. It is a dish of the rural people and generally consumed in winter. Variants of the dish derive from the type of meat used. Hare and cod are often used instead of rabbit.

See also
 List of stews

Spanish soups and stews
Rabbit dishes